The Colisée (formerly Androscoggin Bank Colisée, Central Maine Youth Center, Central Maine Civic Center and Lewiston Colisee) is a 4,000 capacity (3,677 seated) multi-purpose arena, in Lewiston, Maine, that opened in 1958. The Colisée was built to replace St. Dominics Regional High School Arena, and initially constructed and operated by the Catholic parish of SS. Peter and Paul. Currently, it is the home of the Maine Nordiques of the North American Hockey League. The Colisee is also used for concerts, conventions and trade shows. There is 17,000 square feet (1600 m2) of exhibit space. For conventions, the Colisee can accommodate up to 4,800 patrons.

History
The Maine Nordiques of the former professional North American Hockey League were the primary tenant at the Civic Center from 1973 to 1977. The Boston Celtics of the National Basketball Association played exhibition games at the Civic Center.

In 2003, the Lewiston Maineiacs came to the Central Maine Civic Center. The Central Maine Civic Center was renamed to the Lewiston Colisée (from the French word for colosseum, similar to the Colisée de Québec) to distinguish it from the Cumberland County Civic Center, the Augusta Civic Center, and the Bangor Civic Center. In 2007, the Maineiacs won the Presidents Cup, the QMJHL league championship. They remain the only U.S.-based QMJHL team to win the Presidents Cup. The Maineiacs folded at the end of the 2010–11 QMJHL season and the Sherbrooke Phoenix was created in its place.

The Federal Hockey League held five home games at the arena in 2011 and 2012. Due to renovations to the Cumberland County Civic Center, the Portland Pirates played at the Colisee during the 2012–13 AHL season for all but one of their home games.

On December 16, 2014, it was announced the New Hampshire Fighting Spirit from the North American 3 Eastern Hockey League, a Tier III junior league, would relocate to Lewiston and play home games at the Colisee as the L/A Fighting Spirit (with the L/A standing for Lewiston-Auburn) beginning with the 2015–16 season. In 2016, the Fighting Spirit joined the North American 3 Hockey League.

Firland Management, which had acquired the Colisee from the City of Lewiston in 2008, bought the Fighting Spirit in 2017 and rebranded the team as the Lewiston/Auburn Nordiques after the former professional team. In 2019, Cain, Darryl Antonacci, and Nolan Howe were granted an expansion team in the Tier II junior North American Hockey League and named the team the Maine Nordiques. In March 2020, Antonacci agreed to purchase the Colisée and the Tier III Nordiques from Cain. Antonacci folded the Tier III junior team and replaced it with Tier I youth teams.

The naming rights to the venue were sold to Androscoggin Bank in 2006. In 2020, the rights expired, and the bank's name was removed from the venue the following year.

Other uses

Ali vs. Liston fight

On May 25, 1965, the Youth Center was the venue for the WBC heavyweight boxing championship rematch between 34-year old former champ Sonny Liston and 23-year-old reigning champion Muhammad Ali. It was at this fight that Sports Illustrated photographer Neil Leifer took what Time magazine has called the "perhaps the greatest sports photo of the century."

Concerts
On March 19, 1977, Bruce Springsteen and the E Street Band played at the venue. Bob Dylan performed at the venue on November 13, 2000, May 17, 2008 and on April 10, 2013.

Mixed martial arts
Bellator MMA held their first event in Maine on March 21, 2013, Bellator 93.

Ring of Honor/New Japan Pro-Wrestling
On November 7, 2018, Ring of Honor made its Maine debut at the Coliseé. As a co-promoted Global Wars show with New Japan Pro-Wrestling, it also marked the Japanese promotion's first event in New England.

References

External links
 

1958 establishments in Maine
Buildings and structures in Lewiston, Maine
Convention centers in Maine
Indoor ice hockey venues in Maine
Quebec Major Junior Hockey League arenas
Indoor arenas in Maine
Sports in Lewiston, Maine
Sports venues completed in 1958
Tourist attractions in Lewiston, Maine